PJ Meyer (15 May 1873 – 27 July 1919) was a South African international rugby union player who played as a forward.

He made 1 appearance for South Africa against the British Lions in 1896.

References

South African rugby union players
South Africa international rugby union players
1873 births
1919 deaths
Rugby union forwards
Griquas (rugby union) players